The Saint Paul City Council is the governing body of Saint Paul, Minnesota, United States, as part of a strong mayor–council government. There are seven members from seven wards who are elected to four-year terms. Amy Brendmoen is the current president of the council. The council is completely controlled by members of the Minnesota Democratic–Farmer–Labor Party, with all seven members being affiliated with the party.

Council members' hourly wage as of December 2017 is $60.58 per hour.

Elections
In 2009, Saint Paul voters approved the use of the single transferable vote in its elections for city council and mayor, beginning with the 2011 municipal elections. However, since the city council uses single-member districts, the single transferable vote functions the same way as instant-runoff voting. The single transferable vote is also known as "instant-runoff voting," although this is a misnomer since they refer to two different systems of voting. It is also commonly known as "ranked choice voting," although there are other voting methods that involve ranking.

Membership

The Saint Paul City Council members are:

References
Citations

Sources
 
 
"Five incumbents re-elected to St. Paul City Council". November 6, 2019.

Government of Saint Paul, Minnesota
Minnesota city councils